The 47th Edition Vuelta a España (Tour of Spain), a long-distance bicycle stage race and one of the three grand tours, was held from 27 April to 17 May 1992.

Race preview and favorites

Among the starters in Jerez de la Frontera were such big names as Erik Breukink, Robert Millar, Steven Rooks and Stephen Roche. However, none of them seemed to arrive in good form, and none of them lived up to their reputation. Among the locals, the defending champion Melchor Mauri, Pedro Delgado and Laudelino Cubino were the favorites.

Route

Race overview

The first decisive stage was the first individual time trial, won by Dutch rider Erik Breukink. The big surprise that day was pure climber Jesús Montoya who managed second on the stage and took the leader's jersey. Rominger, suffering from a concussion and a knee injury due to an earlier crash, lost almost three minutes.

Two days later, during the queen stage in the Pyrenees, with 5 major mountain passes ending with the ascensions of the Tourmalet and Luz Ardiden, the names of the contenders became clear, as Mauri lost over forty minutes and Rominger dropped the other contenders on the final climb, to finish second to the stage winner Lale Cubino who had spent the day in a breakaway. Cubino, who until then seemed like a candidate for the overall win, lost time on the ascension of Lagos de Covadonga, where Delgado took the stage and rose to second overall. Montoya limited his losses to Delgado, and Rominger finished right with him after being initially dropped.

As Montoya and Delgado closely marked each other's attacks, they were unable to increase their advantage on Rominger who took the lead with a commanding performance in the final flat time trial. After this, Montoya and Delgado joined forces over the final mountain stage, but were unable to unseat Rominger who once again won the stage.

Thus, Rominger became the first Swiss rider to win the Vuelta. He was joined on the final podium by Jesús Montoya and Pedro Delgado.

Doping
Óscar Vargas initially won stage 20, but tested positive for caffeine in the subsequent doping test. He was stripped of his result and given a three-month suspension.

Results

Final General Classification

References

External links
La Vuelta (Official site in Spanish, English, and French)

 
1992 in road cycling
1992